Haloclasty is a type of physical weathering caused by the growth of salt crystals. The process is first started when saline water seeps into cracks and evaporates depositing salt crystals. When the rocks are then heated, the crystals will expand putting pressure on the surrounding rock which will over time splinter the stone into fragments.

Salt crystallization may also take place when solutions decompose rocks (for example, limestone and chalk) to form salt solutions of sodium sulfate or sodium carbonate, from which water evaporates to form their respective salt crystals.

The salts which have proved most effective in disintegrating rocks are sodium sulfate, magnesium sulfate, and calcium chloride. Some of these salts can expand up to three times or more in volume.

It is normally associated with arid climates where strong heating causes strong evaporation and therefore salt crystallization. It is also common along coasts. An example of salt weathering can be seen in the honeycombed stones in sea walls.

References 
F.J.P.M. Kwaad (1970). "http://www.kwaad.net/Salt-weathering.html Experiments on the granular disintegration of granite by salt action]". Accessed October 12, 2007.

Weathering